Samarpal Singh is an Indian politician and a member of the Samajwadi Party, a social democratic political party primarily based in Uttar Pradesh, India. He is a member of the 18th Legislative Assembly of Uttar Pradesh, representing the Naugawan Sadat Assembly constituency of Uttar Pradesh.

Early life 

Samarpal Singh was born in the family of Sardar Singh in Uttar Pradesh, India. He did his graduation from Mahatma Jyotiba Phule Rohilkhand University, Bareilly, in 1981, and LLB from Kedar Nath Girdharilal Khatri PG College Moradabad in 1985.

Political career 

In the 2022 Uttar Pradesh Legislative Assembly election, Samarpal represented Samajwadi Party from the Naugawan Sadat Assembly constituency and defeated Devendra Nagpal of the Bharatiya Janata Party by a margin of 6540 votes.

Posts held

See also 

 18th Uttar Pradesh Assembly
 Uttar Pradesh Legislative Assembly
 Naugawan Sadat Assembly constituency

References 

Living people
Indian Hindus
People from Uttar Pradesh
Indian political people
Samajwadi Party politicians
Uttar Pradesh MLAs 2022–2027
Indian politicians
Year of birth missing (living people)